The compound of small stellated dodecahedron and great dodecahedron is a polyhedron compound where the great dodecahedron is internal to its dual, the small stellated dodecahedron.

This can be seen as one of the two three-dimensional equivalents of the compound of two pentagrams ({10/4} "decagram"); this series continues into the fourth dimension as compounds of star 4-polytopes.

See also
Compound of two tetrahedra
Compound of cube and octahedron
Compound of dodecahedron and icosahedron
Compound of great icosahedron and great stellated dodecahedron

References

Polyhedral compounds